John MacDougall may refer to:

John MacDougall, Lord of Argyll (died 1316), Scottish nobleman and commander
John Gallda MacDougall (died 1371×1377), Scottish nobleman and chief of Clan MacDougall
Lorne MacDougall (1898–1956), Canadian Member of Parliament
John MacDougall (Ontario politician) (born 1947), Canadian Progressive Conservative MP, 1982–1993
John MacDougall (British politician) (1947–2008), Scottish Labour Party MP from 2001 till 2008
John R. MacDougall, better known as the "Captain Midnight" hijacker of the HBO signal in 1986

See also
John McDougall (disambiguation)
John M. MacDougal (born 1954), American botanist
Jack MacDougall (born 1953), Canadian politician